Homoeosoma is a genus of moths of the family Pyralidae.

Species
Homoeosoma achroeella Ragonot, 1887
Homoeosoma albescentellum Ragonot, 1887
Homoeosoma albicosta (Turner, 1947)
Homoeosoma albosparsum (Butler, 1881)
Homoeosoma ammonastes Goodson & Neunzig, 1993
Homoeosoma ardaloniphas Goodson & Neunzig, 1993
Homoeosoma asbenicola Rothschild, 1921
Homoeosoma asylonnastes Goodson & Neunzig, 1993
Homoeosoma atechna Turner, 1947
Homoeosoma basalis Rothschild, 1921
Homoeosoma botydella Ragonot, 1888
Homoeosoma calcella Ragonot, 1887
Homoeosoma candefactella Ragonot, 1887
Homoeosoma capsitanella Chrétien, 1911
Homoeosoma caradjellum Roesler, 1965
Homoeosoma centrosticha Turner, 1947
Homoeosoma contracta Turner, 1947
Homoeosoma costalbella Amsel, 1954
Homoeosoma deceptorium Heinrich, 1956
Homoeosoma electellum (Hulst, 1887) – American sunflower moth
Homoeosoma emandator Heinrich, 1956
Homoeosoma ephestidiella Hampson, 1896
Homoeosoma eremophasma Goodson & Neunzig, 1993
Homoeosoma fornacella (Meyrick, 1879)
Homoeosoma gravosellum Roesler, 1965
Homoeosoma illuviellum Ragonot, 1888
Homoeosoma impressale Hulst, 1886
Homoeosoma incognitellum Roesler, 1965
Homoeosoma inornatellum (Hulst, 1900)
Homoeosoma inustella Ragonot, 1884
Homoeosoma ischnopa (Turner, 1947)
Homoeosoma lechriosema Turner, 1947
Homoeosoma masaiensis Balinsky, 1991
Homoeosoma matsumurella Shibuya, 1927
Homoeosoma miguelensis Meyer, Nuss & Speidel, 1997
Homoeosoma nanophasma Neunzig, 1997
Homoeosoma nebulella Denis & Schiffermüller, 1775 – Eurasian sunflower moth
Homoeosoma nevadellum Roesler, 1965
Homoeosoma nimbella (Duponchel, 1836)
Homoeosoma obatricostella Ragonot, 1887
Homoeosoma oslarellum Dyar, 1905
Homoeosoma oxycercus Goodson & Neunzig, 1993
Homoeosoma parvalbum Blanchard & Knudson, 1985
Homoeosoma pedionnastes Goodson & Neunzig, 1993
Homoeosoma pelosticta Turner, 1947
Homoeosoma phaeoboreas Goodson & Neunzig, 1993
Homoeosoma phaulopa (Turner, 1947)
Homoeosoma picoensis Meyer, Nuss & Speidel, 1997
Homoeosoma privata (Walker in Melliss, 1875)
Homoeosoma punctistrigellum Ragonot, 1888
Homoeosoma quinquepunctella (Warren, 1914)
Homoeosoma scopulella Ragonot, 1888
Homoeosoma sinuella (Fabricius, 1794)
Homoeosoma soaltheirellum Roesler, 1965
Homoeosoma stenopis Turner, 1904
Homoeosoma stenotea Hampson, 1926
Homoeosoma straminea Rothschild, 1921
Homoeosoma striatellum Dyar, 1905
Homoeosoma stypticellum Grote, 1878
Homoeosoma terminella Ragonot, 1901
Homoeosoma uncanale Hulst, 1886
Homoeosoma vagella Zeller, 1848

References

Phycitini
Pyralidae genera